Selsun Blue is an over-the-counter brand of dandruff shampoo now owned by Sanofi. First made by Abbott Laboratories, the brand was bought by Chattem in 2002. Chattem was acquired by Sanofi in 2010, although in some markets, it is sold by Rohto Pharmaceutical instead. Selsun Blue has been marketed as a more effective alternative to brand leader Head & Shoulders due to its superior performance in randomized trials.

Formulations
Over the counter Selsun Blue contains 1% selenium sulfide as its active ingredient in its most popular version (the word "Selsun" is a portmanteau of selenium sulfide + n).  Chattem announced that on November 1, 2005, they would introduce a new line of shampoos under the brand name Selsun Salon.  These contained a different active ingredient than Selsun Blue, pyrithione zinc 1%, and are oriented toward the higher-end shampoo market. Other active ingredients such as salicylic acid and botanicals are in other versions of Selsun Blue brand dandruff shampoo.

In 2011, the Selsun Blue brand consisted of 15 products spread across two brand segments, Naturals and Base.  The Naturals line of products contains the active ingredient salicylic acid in addition to 8 moisturizers & botanicals plus vitamins B5 & E.  Salicylic acid  is a keratolytic agent that assists with cell shedding or flaking.  The base brand consists of six types including Medicated with menthol, 2-in-1, Normal to Oily, Moisturizing, Itchy Dry Scalp, and Deep Cleansing with micro beads.  The first four types contain the active ingredient selenium sulfide which has been shown to have anti-fungal properties. More specifically, selenium sulfide, an anti-infective agent, relieves itching and flaking of the scalp and removes the dry, scaly particles commonly referred to as dandruff or seborrhea. Selenium sulfide is also used to treat tinea versicolor, a fungal infection of the skin.

Deep Cleansing was launched by Chattem in January 2011.  In addition to the active ingredient salicylic acid, the product contains scrubbing micro beads.

Availability
Like Chattem’s other products, Selsun Blue is sold through mass merchandisers, drug and food retailers.

References

External links
Official website

Chattem
Shampoo brands
Skin care brands